Turku City Theatre is a theatre in the City of Turku. It was founded in 1946, when "Turun Teatteri" and "Turun Työväen Teatteri" merged. It was the oldest fully municipality owned theatre in Finland, until 2014, when it became a joint-stock company owned by the City of Turku.

Theatre directors
Jorma Nortimo 1946–1958
Jouko Paavola 1958–1963
Kalervo Nissilä 1963–1968
Kaija Siikala 1968–1972
Ralf Långbacka (art director) and Kalle Holmberg (director) 1972–1977
Jussi Valtakoski 1977
Risto Saanila 1977–1981
Taisto-Bertil Orsmaa 1981–1985
Aulis Ruostepuro 1985
Mikko Majanlahti 1986–1990
Alpo Suhonen 1991–1992
Ilpo Tuomarila 1993–2007
Raija-Liisa Seilo 2008–2013
Arto Valkama 2014– (director) and Mikko Kouki 2014– (art director)

References

External links 
 https://teatteri.turku.fi/en

Theatres in Finland
Buildings and structures in Turku
Tourist attractions in Turku
Theatres completed in 1962
Arts organizations established in 1946